Allison Greenlees (born Allison Hope Cargill; 13 August 1896 – 4 August 1979) formed a group of girl scouts before it was possible for her to become Scotland's first ever Girl Guide and a founder member of Girlguiding Scotland.

Early life 
Born in Hillhead, Glasgow, she was the daughter of Mary Hope Walker Grierson and Sir John Cargill, 1st Baronet. She had no brother and if she had been a son then she would have become a baronet. Greenlees set up a precursor to Girl Guides with five friends from Laurel Bank School, the Cuckoo Patrol, after reading an edition of Scouting for Boys and wanted something like the Boy Scouts to be available to girls. In 1900, the Cuckoo Patrol was adopted into the First Glasgow Scout Group, a year before The Girl Guides Association was established by Agnes Baden-Powell in 1910. and the Cuckoo Patrol became the Girl Guide Thistle Patrol.

Career 

Greenlees went on to establish and develop Girlguiding in Glasgow. After the start of the First World War, she turned her skills to help set up the Glasgow Battalion of the Women's Emergency Corps. In 1930, she became County Commissioner Girlguiding Midlothian and in 1953 she became President of Girlguiding Scotland. She was awarded the Silver Fish Award which is the Girl Guiding's highest adult honour, in 1939.

Legacy 
Allison Cargill House is a registered charity named for her, and it supplies bunk house accommodation in East Lothian for Brownies.

Personal life 

She was married to James Greenlees in 1922. He died in 1951 and she bought the farmhouse and steading of Eaglescairnie House. She died in Edinburgh on 4 August 1979.

References 

1896 births
1979 deaths
Scouting pioneers
People from Hillhead
Daughters of baronets
Recipients of the Silver Fish Award
Girl Guiding and Girl Scouting